Podocarpus matudae is a species of conifer in the family Podocarpaceae. It is found in Guatemala, El Salvador, Honduras and Mexico.

Description
Podocarpus matudae is an evergreen tree. It can grow to large size, with a bole up to 150 cm in diameter.

Habitat and range
Podocarpus matudae is found in the mountains in eastern, southern, and western Mexico and northern Central America, where it inhabits cloud forests between 800 and 2400 meters elevation. It grows in moist areas with mild temperatures and average annual rainfall of 1,500 to 3,000 mm, including frequent fog at higher altitudes. Podocarpus matudae generally grows in small and scattered stands among other forest trees, typically oaks (Quercus spp.), along with species of Liquidambar, Magnolia, Ostrya, and Clethra. It is also found in ravines and along streams in montane pine–oak forests. In Jalisco and Nayarit in western Mexico, it is typically associated with Clusia salvinii, Pinus herrerae, Pinus douglasiana, Abies guatemalensis, and Acer sp.

Its range includes the east-facing slopes of the Sierra Madre Occidental and Sierra Madre de Oaxaca from Tamaulipas to northern Oaxaca states, and the coastal Sierra de Los Tuxtlas mountains in Veracruz. It is also found in the Chiapas Highlands of Mexico's Chiapas state and in the Sierra Madre de Chiapas of Chiapas, Guatemala, and El Salvador. These eastern and southern populations are classed as subspecies Podocarpus matudae subsp. matudae. 

The population from the mountains of Jalisco and Nayarit states in western Mexico is considered a separate subspecies, Podocarpus matudae subsp. jaliscanus.

References

matudae
Near threatened plants
Trees of Mexico
Trees of Central America
Flora of the Sierra Madre Oriental
Sierra Madre de Chiapas
Taxonomy articles created by Polbot
Flora of the Sierra Madre de Oaxaca
Flora of Los Tuxtlas
Cloud forest flora of Mexico
Flora of the Chiapas Highlands